Alexander Swanston (1808 – 24 June 1882) was an Irish Liberal politician.

He was elected as the Member of Parliament (MP) for Bandon at 1874 general election but stood down at the next election in 1880.

References

External links
 

1808 births
1882 deaths
Irish Liberal Party MPs
UK MPs 1874–1880
Members of the Parliament of the United Kingdom for County Cork constituencies (1801–1922)